Govone is a municipality in Piedmont, Italy.

Govone may also refer to:

 Giuseppe Govone, an Italian general and politician of Risorgimento
 GovOne, company acquired by First Data